Gallagher's Travels is a 1987 Australian TV movie about an investigative journalist.

The plot has been described as a reporting team chasing an "animal smuggling ring through the wilds of Australia."

References

External links

1987 television films
1987 films
Australian television films
Films about journalists
Australian action films
1980s English-language films
Films directed by Michael Caulfield
1980s Australian films